Ol Chiki is a Unicode block containing characters of the Ol Chiki, or Ol Cemet' script used for writing the Santali language during the early 20th century.

History
The following Unicode-related documents record the purpose and process of defining specific characters in the Ol Chiki block:

References 

Unicode blocks
Santali language